Agriocnemis sania is a species of damselfly in the family Coenagrionidae. It is found in Egypt, Ethiopia, Kenya, and Libya. Its natural habitats are dry savanna, subtropical or tropical dry shrubland, freshwater springs, saline lakes, intermittent saline lakes, and saline marshes.

References

Coenagrionidae
Insects described in 1959
Taxonomy articles created by Polbot